Alexander Farkas may refer to:

 Sándor Bölöni Farkas (1795–1842), or Alexander Farkas, writer
 Alexander S. Farkas (1930–1999), department store owner